Akkihebbalu Narasimha Murthy Rao (16 June 1900--23 August 2003) was an Indian writer. He wrote in Kannada.

Biography
Born in Akkihebbalu (Mandya District), Murthy studied in Mysore and later taught English at Mysore University. He was the first Director of Kannada and Culture Department of the Karnataka Government and also presided over the 56th All India Kannada Sahitya Sammelana held in 1984.

Murthy is popular for his atheistic thoughts and writings.  He has also written dramas, short stories.  In addition, he was the first director of the Kannada & Sanskriti Department, spearheaded by Kengal Hanumanthaiah.

Works
 AaShaDhaBhoothi (Translation of Molière's drama) 
 Devaru:
 aleyuva mana: (essay, including Homer)
 Aparavayaskana America Yatre (travelogue, account of his travels in Chicago and other places in the U.S.)
 sanjegaNNina hinnOTa(Aftersights in the Evening)
 Hagaluganasugalu (Daydreams)
 Minugu Minchu (Flickering Lightning)
 Janatha Janardhana (Citizen God)
 Mahabharatadalli Kedu Aembudara Samasye (The problem of evil in Mahabharatha)
 Ganavihara (Traveling through music)
 Sahitya Mattu Satya (Literature and Truth)
 Hemavathi Teerada Tavasi (The hermit on the banks of Hemavathi)
 Poorvasoorigalodane (With the ancient masters)
 Shakespeare
 B. M. Srikantaiah
 Paschatya Sanna kathegalu (Western short stories)
 Chitragalu Patragalu (Sketches and Letters)
 Socratesana Koneya Dinagalu (Last days of Socrates)
 Yodhana Punaragamana (Return of the soldier)

And multiple collections of light essays which he was widely known for.

References

1900 births
2003 deaths
Indian atheism activists
Kannada-language writers
People from Mandya district
Recipients of the Sahitya Akademi Award in Kannada
Academic staff of the University of Mysore
Indian centenarians
Writers from Karnataka
20th-century Indian essayists
Indian travel writers